The 2nd East Anglian Regiment (Duchess of Gloucester's Own Royal Lincolnshire and Northamptonshire) was a short-lived infantry regiment of the British Army from 1960 to 1964. Its lineage is continued by the Royal Anglian Regiment.

History
As a result of the Defence Review, it was announced that the 1st Battalion, Royal Lincolnshire Regiment and the 1st Battalion, Northamptonshire Regiment were to merge with the title 2nd East Anglian Regiment (Royal Lincolnshire and Northamptonshire). On 20 August 1959 it was announced that approval had been given to include the name of Duchess of Gloucester in the regiment's title.

The regiment was formed on 1 June 1960, at Watchet, Somerset. A formation parade was held on 10 July. The regiment moved to Osnabrück, Germany, in 1961, where new colours were presented by the colonel-in-chief in the following year.

On 1 September 1964 the 1st East Anglian Regiment (Royal Norfolk and Suffolk Regiment), 2nd and 3rd East Anglian Regiment (16th/44th Foot) and the Royal Leicestershire Regiment were amalgamated to form a new "large regiment" known as the Royal Anglian Regiment. The 2nd East Anglians were redesignated as the 2nd Battalion, Royal Anglian Regiment (Duchess of Gloucester's Own Royal Lincolnshire and Northamptonshire) of the new regiment.

Badges and dress distinctions
All battalions of the East Anglian Brigade wore a common cap badge, with each unit having a distinctive collar badge, coloured lanyard and stable belt. The 2nd East Anglian Regiment wore a collar badge combining elements of the insignia of the two merged regiments: a sphinx and the battle honour Talavera for the Royal Lincolns and Northamptons respectively. A black lanyard, inherited from the Northamptonshire Regiment, was worn. The regiment's stable belt combined the colours of those of the two predecessors, dark blue with a buff and dark red stripe.

References

External links
2nd East Anglian Regiment (Duchess of Gloucester's Own Royal Lincolnshire and Northamptonshire) (regiments.org)

East Anglian
Military units and formations established in 1960
Military units and formations disestablished in 1964